Heckel could be:

Blayne Heckel (born 1953), American experimental physicist
Erich Heckel (1883–1970), German painter and print maker
Johann Jakob Heckel (1790–1857), Austrian ichthyologist
Édouard Marie Heckel (1843–1916), French botanist and medical doctor.
Wilhelm Heckel GmbH, woodwind musical instrument manufacturer based in Wiesbaden, Germany